Canastota Methodist Church, now known as Greystone Community Center, or Greystone Castle, is a historic Methodist church at Main and New Boston streets in Canastota in Madison County, New York.  It was built in 1909 and is a large, asymmetrical building built of Pennsylvania white marble.  It reflects the influence of the Richardsonian Romanesque style in its heavy, horizontal massing, wrought-hewn masonry construction and broad, round arch door and window openings. A tower has a crenellated turret at the top.

It was added to the National Register of Historic Places in 1986.

References

Methodist churches in New York (state)
Churches on the National Register of Historic Places in New York (state)
Churches completed in 1909
20th-century Methodist church buildings in the United States
Former Methodist church buildings in the United States
Churches in Madison County, New York
Former churches in New York (state)
National Register of Historic Places in Madison County, New York